Bhuk Deurali  is a village development committee in Parbat District in the Dhawalagiri Zone of central Nepal.

References

External links
UN map of the municipalities of Parbat District

Populated places in Parbat District